SS Afric was a steamship built for White Star Line by Harland and Wolff shipyards. Afric was launched on November 16, 1898, and was involved in shipping between Liverpool and Australia.

Afric was a single-funnel liner with capacity for 320 third class passengers on three decks, she also had substantial cargo capacity with seven cargo holds, most of them refrigerated for the transport of Australian meat.

Service history
Afric made her maiden voyage on 8 February 1899, between Liverpool and New York; this was considered a test run, and when she returned she underwent further work to prepare her for her intended career on the Australia service. She entered service between Liverpool and Sydney via Cape Town on 9 September 1899.

During the Boer War from 1900 to 1902, Afric was used to transport troops and horses to South Africa on the outbound part of her journey, returning them to the UK on the return journey.

Following the conclusion of the war, Afric settled into the routine of normal peacetime service, which was mostly uneventful, except for one incident in November 1913 when she ran aground and became stuck on a sandbank in the River Mersey whilst leaving the Canada Dock at Liverpool. After several unsuccessful attempts to free her, she was eventually pulled off the sandbank by tugs at high tide after her cargo had been removed by barges to lighten the ship. 

Following the outbreak of the First World War in 1914, Afric was requisitioned by the Australian government in October 1914 for use as a troopship and was given the designation HMAT (Hired Military Australian Transport) A19. In April/May 1915 she was refitted at Sydney to carry 549 troops and 500 horses.

Wreck

References 

1898 ships
Ships built in Belfast
Passenger ships of the United Kingdom
Ships built by Harland and Wolff
Ships of the White Star Line
Maritime incidents in 1917
Afric